Theatre photography first took place in the photographer's studio before the photographer could come to the theatre with the appropriate technical equipment and take pictures on stage.
Theatre photography is a genre of photography. Its  are performers on theatre stages as well as scenery or (rarely) prop or stage design. Trends in theatre photography are drama, opera, ballet, puppet theatre, cabaret, variety show and portraits of artists.

Genre 
Theatre photography serves as documentation and advertising for a theatre. Documentation includes the capturing of an artistic expression, the presentation, the realization of the theme and also the stage design. Recordings of theatre scenes and performers are used in showcases, for theatre posters, programme booklets and advertisements. The most extensive use of theatre photos is in the media, mainly to illustrate reviews and reviews, more often to announce new productions.

Professional theatre photographers are usually self-employed and are booked for the respective production, although contracts for the entire theatre season are quite common. Some large theatres have their own advertising department, in which permanently committed photographers also work.

Practice 
The use of digital single-lens reflex camera and fast objectives with different focal length - depending on the size of the stage - enables the theater photographer to react to the most diverse light moods on stage. Many theatre photographers also shoot in raw image format to compensate for colour cast and deviating colour temperature in the digital workflow. In addition, digital photography allows a quick and timely publication of the photos in mass media.

Photographs are mainly taken only during rehearsals so that the performance is not affected. There are often extra "photo and TV rehearsals" before the premiere, to which press photographers are invited. Photo and TV rehearsals, for example, are the standard in all theatres and opera houses in Berlin and Hamburg, Salzburg and Vienna.

Well known stage photographers

Further reading 
 Barbara Lesák: Von der Pose zum Ausdruck. Theaterphotographie 1900–1930. 224 p., Brandstätter, 2003,  (History of Theatre Photography in Austria)
 Claudia Balk: Theaterfotografie. Eine Darstellung ihrer Geschichte anhand der Sammlung des Deutschen Theatermuseums. 231 p., Hirmer, Munich, 1989, 
 Die Deutsche Bühne: The magazine is published monthly in Friedrich Berlin Verlag, Berlin.
 Theater heute: The magazine is published monthly in Friedrich Berlin Verlag, Berlin.
 Theater der Zeit: The magazine is published monthly in Verlag Theater der Zeit, Berlin.

References

External links 

Photography by genre